Pramitha Bandara Tennakoon (born 11 September 1978) is a Sri Lankan politician, former Cabinet Minister, former provincial minister and Member of Parliament. He served as the Minister of Ports and Shipping in the Cabinet of President Gotabaya Rajapaksa.

Tennakoon was born on 11 September 1978. He is the son of Janaka Bandara Tennakoon and grandson of T. B. Tennekoon, both government ministers. He was educated at St. Peter's College, Colombo. He has a LLB degree from the University of Buckingham and LLM degree from La Trobe University. He was member of the diplomatic staff the Sri Lankan embassy in Cairo, Egypt.

Tennakoon was a member of the Central Provincial Council and Minister for Sports, Youth Affairs, Women's Affairs and Rural Industries Development for the Central Province. He contested the 2020 parliamentary election as a Sri Lanka People's Freedom Alliance electoral alliance candidate in Matale District and was elected to the Parliament of Sri Lanka.

Following the mass resignation of the Sri Lankan cabinet in the wake of the 2022 Sri Lankan protests, he was appointed as the Minister of Ports and Shipping by President Gotabaya Rajapaksa on 18 April 2022. He served until 9 May 2022 following another mass resignation of the Sri Lankan cabinet.

References

1978 births
Alumni of St. Peter's College, Colombo
Alumni of the University of Buckingham
La Trobe University alumni
Living people
Members of the 16th Parliament of Sri Lanka
Members of the Central Province Board of Ministers
Prisoners and detainees of Sri Lanka
Sinhalese politicians
Sports ministers of Sri Lankan provinces
Sri Lankan Buddhists
Sri Lankan prisoners and detainees
Sri Lanka People's Freedom Alliance politicians
Sri Lanka Podujana Peramuna politicians
United People's Freedom Alliance politicians
Women's ministers of Sri Lankan provinces
Youth ministers of Sri Lankan provinces